"Switch On!" is the 13th single by Japanese pop singer Anna Tsuchiya, released on November 23, 2011. It is the opening theme for the Kamen Rider Series Kamen Rider Fourze. "Switch On!" debuted on the Oricon's daily charts at number 15, while its music video hit number 3 on the RecoChoku video download charts. The single ultimately peaked at number 13 on the Oricon's Weekly Charts and 24 on the Billboard Japan Hot 100. The song was certified gold by the RIAJ for 100,000 downloads to cellphones in August 2012.

The single was initially scheduled to be released on October 26, 2011. However its release, along with the release of Maki Ohguro's balladic version of "Anything Goes!", were pushed back by a month for unknown reasons.

Development
Tsuchiya decided to collaborate with the Kamen Rider Series after her son became a fan of the previous series Kamen Rider OOO, and she had watched the series as a child herself. She was also glad that she was going to perform the song for the franchise's 40th anniversary. The song was written by Shoko Fujibayashi (lyrics) and tatsuo of the band everset (composition and arrangement).

Track listing

References

2011 singles
Anna Tsuchiya songs
Japanese-language songs
Japanese television drama theme songs
Kamen Rider Fourze
2011 in Japanese music
Songs with lyrics by Shoko Fujibayashi